Park Ji-hyun (born August 4, 1979) is a South Korean curler. She was the lead on the South Korean National Women's Curling Team for the 2001–02 curling season.

Career
Park was the lead on Team Kim Mi-yeon which won the Pacific Curling Championships gold medal in 2001, earning the Korean team their first ever appearance at the World Curling Championships. At the 2002 Worlds, the team finished last and without a single win, going 0–9.

Park would only win the Pacific Championship one time, with silver medals in 2000, 2002 and 2003 and bronze medals in 2004 and 2007. Park Ji-hyun would skip the South Korean team in 2007, finishing with a 4–4 round robin record and losing the World Championship berth game to Japan's Moe Meguro.

References

External links

1979 births
Living people
South Korean female curlers
Asian Games medalists in curling
Curlers at the 2003 Asian Winter Games
Medalists at the 2003 Asian Winter Games
Asian Games silver medalists for South Korea